Events from the year 1585 in the Kingdom of Scotland.

Incumbents
Monarch – James VI

Events
Curators Act 1585 passed

Births
13 December – William Drummond of Hawthornden, poet (died 1649)
date unknown –
William Forbes, first Bishop of Edinburgh (died 1634)
Sir John Scott of Scotstarvet, noble, known as a lawyer, statesman and author (died 1670)
James Wedderburn, Bishop of Dunblane (died 1639)

Deaths
 February – George Seton, 7th Lord Seton (born 1531)
 March – Robert Crichton, Bishop of Dunkeld
 1 September – Alexander Arbuthnot, printer
 4 December – John Willock, reformer (born )

See also
 Timeline of Scottish history

References

 
Years of the 16th century in Scotland